R345 road may refer to:
 R345 road (Ireland)
 R345 road (South Africa)